The Nidhanpur copperplate inscription of the 7th-century Kamarupa king Bhaskaravarman gives a detailed account of land grants given to Brahmins. It records land grants to more than two hundred vaidika brahmanas belonging to 56 gotras. The copper plates were found mostly in Panchakhanda pargana where, according to historians, the actual granted lands were located. This Sanskrit inscription contains the names of donees which are more than two hundred in numbers.

The inscriptions recorded by Bhaskaravarman in different parts of India provide a detailed account of his rule and associate events. It was customary among the kings of Kamarupa to issue seals for every major event related to the kingdom be they giving land grants to Brahmins or winning a war.

Discovery
The copper plates were discovered on 29 December 1912, in the village of Nidhanpur in Panchakhanda near Sylhet, Bangladesh. They were discovered by a cultivator during the process of building a buffalo shed. Thinking that they were a clue to the location of a hidden treasure, he took the plates to a local landholder who recognised them for what they were and brought them to the attention of authorities in Silchar in present-day Assam, India.

Translation
The following is the translation of the inscription by Padmanath Bhattacharya Vidya Vinod:

Since after the burning of the plates, these newly written letters are (obviously) different in form (from the letters of the earlier grant) they are not (to be respected as) forged.' (v. 28)

See also
 Kamarupa of Bhaskaravarman
 Pal family of Panchakhanda

Notes

References

Kamarupa (former kingdom)
Sanskrit inscriptions in India